Kolinec is a market town in Klatovy District in the Plzeň Region of the Czech Republic. It has about 1,400 inhabitants.

Administrative parts
Villages of Bernartice, Boříkovy, Brod, Buršice, Hradiště, Javoří, Jindřichovice, Lukoviště, Malonice, Mlázovy, Podolí, Sluhov, Střítež, Tajanov, Tržek, Ujčín and Vlčkovice are administrative parts of Kolinec.

Geography
It lies on the border between the Blatná Uplands and Bohemian Forest Foothills. The Ostružná River flows through the market town. There are several ponds in the municipal territory.

History
The first written mention of Kolinec is from 1290. It was probably founded as a settlement of gold panners. Until the mid-14th century, it was owned by Bohemian queens, then it was granted to the Lords of Velhartice. In 1506, Kolinec became property of Zdeněk Lev of Rožmitál, during whose reign great development occurred.

Sights
The Church of Saint James the Great was originally a fortified Romanesque church from the end of the 12th century. It was baroque rebuilt in 1727–1730 and in 1749–1755, but it retained its Romanesque core. The tower was added in 1854.

The Church of Saint John the Baptist is Mlázovy is an early Gothic building from the first half of the 14th century.

In the territory of Kolinec, there are several small castles that once served as aristrocratic residences and are now cultural monuments.

Notable people
Johann Král (1823–1912), musician

Twin towns – sister cities

Kolinec is twinned with:

 Tápiószentmárton, Hungary
 Zemianska Olča, Slovakia

Gallery

References

External links

Populated places in Klatovy District
Market towns in the Czech Republic
Prácheňsko